Richard Haydn (born George Richard Haydon, 10 March 1905 – 25 April 1985) was a British-American comedy actor. Some of his better known performances include his roles as Professor Oddley in Ball of Fire (1941), Roger in No Time for Love (1943), Thomas Rogers in And Then There Were None (1945), Emperor Franz Joseph in The Emperor Waltz (1948), the Caterpillar in Alice in Wonderland (1951), Baron Popoff in The Merry Widow (1952), William Brown in Mutiny on the Bounty (1962), and Max Detweiler in The Sound of Music (1965).

Life
Haydn was born on March 10, 1905, in Camberwell. After working as a music hall entertainer and overseer of a Jamaican banana plantation, he joined a touring British theatre troupe, and then moved into television and film.

Haydn never married nor had children, although he was engaged to the actress Maria Riva for several months in 1943. In the DVD commentary of Young Frankenstein, Mel Brooks said that Haydn eschewed the Hollywood lifestyle and that he used gardening and horticulture as a means of escape. Richard Haydn was gay.

Haydn died on April 25, 1985 at the age of 80 following a heart attack. His body was found in his home in Pacific Palisades, California, and was donated to the University of California, Los Angeles.

Television and film work

Haydn was known for playing eccentric characters, such as Edwin Carp, Claud Curdle (Mr. Music, 1950), Richard Rancyd (Miss Tatlock's Millions, 1948) and Stanley Stayle (Dear Wife, 1949). Much of his stage delivery was done in a deliberate over-nasalized and over-enunciated manner. 

Notable performances included the voice of the Caterpillar in the 1951 Disney animated adaptation of Alice in Wonderland, and his small role of Herr Falkstein in the 1974 Mel Brooks comedy Young Frankenstein. Haydn was the manservant Rogers in the 1945 adaptation of Agatha Christie's And Then There Were None, and William Brown in the 1962 version of Mutiny on the Bounty. He was acclaimed for his role in Rodgers and Hammerstein's 1965 film musical The Sound of Music, in which he played the Von Trapps' family friend Max Detweiler.

Haydn performed as the nosy neighbour and gossip in Sitting Pretty with Clifton Webb and Maureen O'Hara in 1948, using his over-nasal voice. He was Prof. Summerlee in 1960's The Lost World, and in the same year, played opposite Doris Day in Please Don't Eat the Daisies.

In the 1960 The Twilight Zone episode "A Thing About Machines", he portrayed Mr. Bartlett Finchley, a quirky, self-absorbed, technophobe who is confronted by every machine in his home. On April 1, 1964, he reprised his character of Edwin Carp in an episode of The Dick Van Dyke Show which saluted several old-time radio performers.

On 11 April 1968 he appeared as a Japanese businessman on the episode of Bewitched titled "A Majority of Two". On 23 February 1969, he played the Magician who had twin daughters on the episode of Bonanza titled "The Lady and the Mountain Lion" (S10/Ep21). On 12 January 1973, he appeared as Edward the butler in season 4 episode 15 of Love American Style titled "Love and the Impossible Gift".

Other work
Haydn had a brief spell as a film director starting in the late 1940s. He directed:
Miss Tatlock's Millions (1948)
Dear Wife (1949)
Mr. Music (1950)

On radio, Haydn played Edwin Carp on The Charlie McCarthy Show, and he was a regular on The Swan Soap Show, which featured George Burns and Gracie Allen. Haydn wrote one book, titled The Journal of Edwin Carp, in 1954.

He debuted on Broadway in 1939 in Set to Music and appeared in Two for the Show (1940).

Filmography

Film

Television

References

External links

 
 
 
 
 

1905 births
1985 deaths
20th-century English male actors
British expatriate male actors in the United States
British male comedy actors
English expatriates in the United States
English male film actors
English male radio actors
English male television actors
English male voice actors
Male actors from London
People from Camberwell